Musha may refer to:

Locations
Musha, Egypt
Musha, Rwanda
Musha Cay, an island in the Bahamas

Agriculture
Musha land, common agricultural lands in the Ottoman Empire

Film
 Musha Motors, a fictional car company in the Speed Racer film adaptation

Video games
MUSHA, a 1990 shoot 'em up for the Sega Genesis
Musya, a 1992 side-scrolling action game for the Super NES

See also
Muzha (disambiguation)